George Harney may refer to:

 George Harney (baseball) (1890–1959), American baseball pitcher in the Negro leagues
 George Edward Harney (1840–1924), American architect based in New York City
 George Julian Harney (1817–1897), British political activist, journalist, and Chartist leader